Peter C. Anderson was a member of the Wisconsin State Assembly. Elected in 1906, he represented St. Croix County, Wisconsin. Anderson was also President (similar to Mayor) of the village of Hammond, Wisconsin. He was a Democrat.

References

People from St. Croix County, Wisconsin
Mayors of places in Wisconsin
Year of birth missing
Year of death missing
Democratic Party members of the Wisconsin State Assembly